Aeronaut is a person who participates in aeronautics.

Aeronaut may also refer to:

Aeronaut, album by Parralox
"Aeronaut", song by Parralox
"Aeronaut", song from Billy Corgan album Ogilala

See also

Aeronautics (album)